Americano may refer to:

Drinks
 Caffè Americano, a style of coffee prepared by adding hot water to espresso
 Americano (apéritif), a variety of apéritif
 Americano (cocktail), a cocktail composed of Campari, sweet vermouth, and club soda

Arts and entertainment

Films
 The Americano (1916 film), a 1916 film directed by John Emerson
 The Americano (1955 film), a 1956 film directed by William Castle
 Americano (2005 film), a 2005 film
 Americano (2011 film), a 2011 film
 El Americano: The Movie, a 2016 film

Music
 "Americano" (song), a 2011 song by Lady Gaga
 "The Americano", instrumental single by Xavier Cugat 1954
 "Americano", a cover of the Renato Carosone song "Tu vuò fà l'americano" by The Brian Setzer Orchestra from the album Vavoom!
 ¡Americano!, a 2004 album by Roger Clyne and the Peacemakers
 "Americanos" (song), a 1989 song by Holly Johnson

Theatre 

 ¡Americano! (musical), a 2020 musical

Places
 Americano Creek, a river in Sonoma County, California, US
 Rancho Estero Americano, a Mexican land grant in Sonoma County, California, US

Sports
 Americano Futebol Clube, a Brazilian football (soccer) club from Campos dos Goytacazes, Rio de Janeiro
 Americano Futebol Clube (MA), a Brazilian football club in Bacabal, Maranhão 
 Sport Club Americano, a defunct Brazilian football (soccer) club from Santos, São Paulo
 Sport Club Americano (Porto Alegre), a defunct Brazilian football (soccer) club from Porto Alegre, Rio Grande do Sul

See also
 Fútbol Americano, marketing name used for the first National Football League (NFL) regular season game held outside the US
 Americanum
 Americanus (disambiguation)
 Americana (disambiguation)
 Americain (disambiguation)
 American (disambiguation)